Friday the 13th: Killer Puzzle is a 2018 horror puzzle video game for iOS, Android, Steam, Nintendo Switch, PlayStation 4 and Xbox One developed by Blue Wizard Digital. The game was released on January 20, 2018, in the US and April 13 worldwide. It is the fourth official video game based on the Friday the 13th franchise.

The game won iOS app of the week on January 26 the same year.

Gameplay 
Players control Jason Voorhees by sliding him around an isometric puzzle to attack  victims directly or indirectly, in "Kill Scenes". There are multiple episodes, ranging from campgrounds to outer space.

References

External links
 

2018 video games
Android (operating system) games
IOS games
MacOS games
Nintendo Switch games
PlayStation 4 games
Post-apocalyptic video games
Video games about time travel
Video games based on Friday the 13th (franchise)
Video games developed in Canada
Video games set in 1980
Video games set in 1984
Video games set in 2018
Video games set in 2019
Video games set in amusement parks
Video games set in London
Video games set in New Jersey
Video games set in New York City
Video games set in outer space
Video games set in prehistory
Video games set in prison
Video games set in Scotland
Video games set in the 12th century
Video games set in the 19th century
Video games set in the 2040s
Video games set in the future
Windows games
Xbox One games